Silver Key Press is the anglophone imprint of the French non-profit small press La Clef d'Argent specializing in weird fiction, fantastique, fantasy and science fiction.

It was named as an explicit homage to H. P. Lovecraft, referring to the short-story «The Silver Key» he wrote in 1926.

Since 1987, La Clef d'Argent has published contemporary stories (Jean-Pierre Andrevon, Jonas Lenn) and essays (S.T. Joshi, Lionel Dupuy), classic English-language stories in French translation (Clark Ashton Smith, George Sylvester Viereck) and long-forgotten stories from French masters of the genre (Édouard Ganche, Charles de Coynart, Théo Varlet, Gabriel de Lautrec).

La Clef d'Argent now publishes books in English under the imprint Silver Key Press, in Esperanto, as La Arĝenta Ŝlosilo, and in Spanish, as La Llave de Plata.

English books published by Silver Key Press 
 The Sorcerer Departs (Donald Sidney-Fryer)

References

External links 
 Silver Key Press

La Clef d'Argent
Small press publishing companies
Horror book publishing companies
Fantasy book publishers
Science fiction publishers